The Palestinian Economic Council for Development and Reconstruction (PECDAR) is an independent institution established by the Palestine Liberation Organization in 1993.  Its main responsibilities are coordination with donor communities in projects building the Palestinian National Authority's infrastructure, as well as economic policy advocacy.  It is headed by Muhammad Abu Awad and is accountable to a Board of Trustees headed by Mahmoud Abbas.

References

External links 
 Official Website

Organizations based in the State of Palestine
Organizations established in 1993